The CDU Hamburg is the regional state association of the Christian Democratic Union of Germany (CDU) in Hamburg, Germany. As of 2019, there are about 6,474 members in the association, about 40 percent are women. In 1946, from 1953 to 1957 and from 2001 to 2011, the party appointed the First Mayor of Hamburg. The CDU Hamburg has been part of the opposition since 2011. Seven district associations and 47 local associations form the basis for the political commitment of the CDU Hamburg.

In 2020, two-time member of the Bundestag Christoph Ploß had been elected as chairman of the party.

Election results

2011 state elections 
In the early state elections in 2011, former First Mayor Christoph Ahlhaus (CDU) had to admit defeat to his challenger Olaf Scholz (SPD). Compared to the 2008 elections, the CDU Hamburg had lost almost half their voters and received their worst result of all time, while the Social Democrats achieved the absolute majority of the parliamentary mandates. After the election results, then chairman Frank Schira announced his resignation. Marcus Weinberg succeeded him as chairman in 2011.

2015 state elections 
The front runner for the 2015 Hamburg state elections was parliamentary group leader Dietrich Wersich. With 15.9% of the state vote lists, the CDU Hamburg fell to a new historic low and thus only appointed 20 of 121 members of the 21st Hamburg Parliament. The CDU won at least one direct mandate in all 17 constituencies, as well as two in the Alstertal-Walddorfer constituency. Just like in the 2011 federal elections, the Alstertal-Walddörfer, Süderelbe and Bergedorf constituencies remained the strongholds of the CDU Hamburg. After the state elections, Marcus Weinberg announced his resignation as state chairman. On March 31 of  2015, Roland Heintze was elected as his successor.

2020 state elections 
In the 2020 Hamburg state election, the CDU lost around a third of its share of votes and, at 11.2%, had to accept its second-lowest result in a state election since the party's founding 68 years prior - the worst result being 9,0% in the 1951 Bremen state elections. The then front runner and member of the Bundestag Marcus Weinberg, the former front runner Dietrich Wersich, then chairman Roland Heintze and chairman of the Hamburg Young Union Philipp Heißner also missed the entry into the Hamburg Parliament. Since 15 direct mandates were won in both the constituencies as well as for the party itself, only 15 seats in the Hamburg Parliament were given to the CDU.

Chairmen of the state association 

On October 1, 1945, Franz Beyrich was elected as the party's first chairman. Beyrich, who belonged to the Roman Catholic minority in Hamburg, had been a government employee until the National Socialists came to power. Dismissed by the Nazi regime, he changed fields to work in the private sector. After the 20 July plot, Beyrich was arrested and imprisoned in the Fuhlsbüttel concentration camp.

Complete list of chairmen

State Parliament 

There are 15 members in the CDU parliamentary group in the Hamburg Parliament.

Chair 

The board of the CDU parliamentary group consists of nine members:

 Dennis Thering, chairman of the CDU parliamentary group
 Anke Frieling, deputy parliamentary group leader
 Richard Seelmaecker, deputy parliamentary group leader
 Dennis Gladiator, Parliamentary Secretary
 David Erkalp, assessor
 Götz T. Wiese, assessor
 Silke Seif, assessor
 Thilo Kleibauer, party representative in the Hamburg Parliament Budget Committee, member by virtue of office
 André Trepoll, Vice President of the Hamburg Parliament, member by virtue of office

Other members 

Birgit Stöver, Eckard H. Graage, Andreas Grutzeck, Sandro Kappe, Ralf Niedmers, Stephan A. Gamm

External links 

 Official Website of the CDU Hamburg 
 Official Website of the parliamentary group in the Hamburg Parliament

References 

Christian Democratic Union of Germany
Politics of Hamburg
State sections of political parties in Germany